Gudo de Cavaleiro is a mountain in the middle of the island Santo Antão in Cape Verde. Its elevation is 1,810 meters. Part of the eastern plateau of Santo Antão, it lies directly south of the Moroços natural park. Nearby places are the villages Alto Mira to the west and Lagoa to the east. The mountain lies on the border of the municipalities Ribeira Grande and Porto Novo.

See also
List of mountains in Cape Verde

References

Geography of Santo Antão, Cape Verde
Mountains of Cape Verde
Ribeira Grande Municipality